Es Mentira is the debut studio album by Argentine band Miranda!. It was released by Secsy Discos on November 1, 2002. The ten songs that are part of the album are composed by Alejandro Sergi, produced by Bruno De Vincenti and mastered by Luis Castillo at the Acum23 studio in Buenos Aires. Es Mentira is an electropop record.

It had two reissues, in 2005 by Pelo Discos, and in 2016 by Sony Music.

Singles 
The first song released as a single was "Bailarina", which featured a music video made by Doma, a group also in charge of the album's cover art. The music video was published and broadcast on January 2003 on the Locomotion channel. Months later, the music videos for three more tracks were published: "Imán", "Tu Juego" and "Agua".

Critical reception 
"Es Mentira" received positive reviews from critics. A writer for the Argentine newspaper Clarín defined the album as "the return of glamour" and also described it as "a festive refuge in the midst of a crisis", alluding to the  2001 Crisis that was taking place in the country due to the 1998–2002 Argentine great depression. In a 2022's review, Revista Charcos Octavio Gallo wrote: "the album combines a beautiful pop melody with a strongly electronic and very danceable rhythm, the two most important elements of Miranda!'s sound".

Track listing 
All songs written by Alejandro Sergi and produced by Bruno De Vicenti.

Credits and personnel 
Credits adapted from the liner notes of Es Mentira.

 Alejandro Sergi – lead vocals, composition, programming
 Juliana Gatttas – lead vocals
 Leandro Fuentes – guitar, background vocals
 Bruno de Vincenti – production, programming
 Sebastián Rimoldi – piano
 Luis Castillo – mastering
 Laura Bilbao – management
 Rodrigo Piza – executive production
 Walter Zamora – art direction

References 

2002 debut albums
Spanish-language albums
Miranda! albums